Lewis Jackson may refer to:

 Lewis Jackson (basketball, born 1989), American collegiate basketball player for Purdue University
 Lewis Jackson (basketball coach), men's college basketball head coach at Alabama State University
 Lewis Jackson, pseudonym of Ladbroke Black (1877–1940), English journalist and author

See also
 Jackson Lewis, an American law firm based in New York